Jean-Louis-Théodore Bachelet (15 January 1820 – 26 September 1879) was a 19th-century French historian and musicologist.

Biography 
Aftr studying at the Lycée Pierre-Corneille in Rouen and the Lycée Hoche in Versailles, he entered the École normale in 1840 and was received agrégé d'histoire in 1846. Successively a teacher of history at colleges in Le Havre, Chartres and St. Quentin, then in high schools at Clermont-Ferrand and Coutances, he was appointed in 1847 Professor of History at lycée of Rouen, where he taught until 1873 and in the preparatory school to higher education in this city. Also an accomplished musicologist, he donated his important fifteenth to eighteenth centuries sheet music collection at the Library of Rouen of which he also was responsible after 1873.

In collaboration with Charles Dezobry, Bachelet wrote:
 , Paris, 1857 and 1863. Reprint: Paris, Delagrave, 1889, 2 vol., 2989 p. ;
 , Paris, 1863.

Publications 
1837: Psaumes et cantiques en faux bourdon, Rouen, Fleury Fils Ainé.
1852: La Guerre de cent ans, Rouen, Mégard ; rééd. Nîmes, Lacour, 2013.
1863: Les Français en Italie au XVI, Rouen, Mégard.
1853: Mahomet et les Arabes, Rouen, Mégard
1853: Les Rois catholiques d’Espagne, Rouen, Mégard.
1859: les Grands Ministres français : Suger, Jacques Cœur, Sully, Richelieu, Mazarin, Colbert 
1868: Histoire de Napoléon Ier, Rouen, Mégard
1863: Saint-Louis roi de France   
1868–75: Cours d’histoire, 3 vol., Paris, A. Courcier, 1878–1885.
1869: François Ier et son siècle
1871–74: Cours d’histoire de France, 3 vol., Paris, A. Courcier, 1874–1879.
1864: Les Hommes illustres de France, Rouen, Mégard.
1874: Histoire des temps modernes, Paris, A. Courcier. 
1886: Les Arabes : origine, mœurs, religion, conquêtes, Rouen, Mégard.

Sources 
 Édouard Frère, Manuel du bibliographe normand, Rouen, Le Brument, 1860, (p. 59).
 Gustave Vapereau, Dictionnaire universel des contemporains, Paris, Hachette, 1870, (p. 84).

References

External links 
 Théodore Bachelet on data.bnf.fr

19th-century French historians
French librarians
French lexicographers
Writers from Normandy
19th-century French musicologists
1820 births
People from Seine-Maritime
1879 deaths
19th-century lexicographers
19th-century musicologists